Tetrasodium EDTA is the salt resulting from the neutralization of ethylenediaminetetraacetic acid with four equivalents of sodium hydroxide (or an equivalent sodium base).  It is a white solid that is highly soluble in water.  Commercial samples are often hydrated, e.g. Na4EDTA.4H2O.  The properties of solutions produced from the anhydrous and hydrated forms are the same, provided they are at the same pH.

It is used as a source of the chelating agent EDTA4-.  A 1% aqueous solution has a pH of approximately 11.3.  When dissolved in neutral water, it converts partially to H2EDTA2-.  Ethylenediaminetetraacetic acid is produced commercially via the intermediacy of tetrasodium EDTA.

Products

The substance is also known as Dissolvine E-39. It is a salt of edetic acid. It has been known at least since 1954. It is sometimes used as a chelating agent.

The assignee on 5% of patents at the USPTO containing the substance is the firm Procter and Gamble. It is used most notably in cosmetics and hair and skin care products.

The substance has been used to aid in formulation of a removal product for rust, corrosion, and scale from ferrous metal, copper, brass, and other surfaces.

At a concentration of 6%, it is the main active ingredient in some types of engine coolant system flushes.

References

Acetic acids
Amines
Antidotes
Chelating agents
Preservatives
E-number additives